Throne and altar can refer to

 The ideology of Joseph de Maistre
 Monarchism in France
 Relations between the Catholic Church and the state